Shiraz Pasargad Higher Education Institute is a research and education branch of Shiraz University.  

The university has over 2000 students in six Associate's degrees programs (A.S.), seven Bachelor's degrees programs (B.S.), and five Master's degree programs.

External links
 
 Shiraz University Central Library
 Shiraz University International Campus

Education in Shiraz
Universities in Iran
Buildings and structures in Shiraz